Doublecrossed is a 1991 American action film written and directed by Roger Young. The film stars Dennis Hopper, Robert Carradine, Richard Jenkins, Adrienne Barbeau, Don Hood and G. W. Bailey. The film premiered on HBO July 20, 1991.

Plot
This film tries to capture the life of Barry Seal, a one-time airline pilot who winds up being one of Pablo Escobar's biggest aides in delivering cocaine into the United States. Eventually, Seal is caught by the DEA and in order to stave off serious jail time, he identifies Pablo Escobar as the leader of the Medellin cartel. He eventually goes on to provide the first ever photographic evidence of Escobar.

It culminates in Seal's assassination by the Medellin Cartel which occurs after the DEA goes back on a plea deal. The judge sentences Seal to community service and declines to accept the conditions Seal needed (notably that since his life was in danger, he needed freedom of movement). Seal reports to his court mandated community service where gunmen are waiting for him, and he is shot dead.

Cast 
Dennis Hopper as Barry Seal
Robert Carradine as Dave Booker
Richard Jenkins as Jim Donaldson
Adrienne Barbeau as Debbie Seal
Don Hood as Tony
G. W. Bailey as Camp
Danny Trejo as Lito
Salvador Levy
Danny Kamin as Lt. Alvey 
John McConnell		
Eliott Keener 		
Ed Amatrudo as Ochoa
Jerry Leggio as Judge Altzo
Brooks Read as Judge Courier
Kevin Quigley as Regent
John Wilmot as Biggs
Richard Folmer as Blomquist
Edward Edwards as Oliver North
Thomas Uskali as Wright
James Borders as Coulter
Luigi Rivera as Gacha
William Agosto as Vaughn
Casey Sander as Ron Caffrey
Jim Gleason as Scott
David Dahlgren as Pilot 
Dennis Platt as Saunders

References

External links
 

1991 television films
1991 films
American action drama films
1990s action drama films
HBO Films films
Films directed by Roger Young
Films set in 1986
Films set in Louisiana
American drama television films
1990s English-language films
1990s American films